John McAdam  may refer to:

 John Loudon McAdam (1756–1836), Scottish engineer noted for inventing the process of "macadamization" of roads
 John McAdam (businessman), American businessman
 John McAdam (politician) (1807–1893), Irish-born politician in New Brunswick, Canada
 John Macadam (1827–1865), Australian (Scottish-born) chemist, medical teacher and politician, after whom the Macadamia nut is named

See also
 John McAdams (disambiguation)